Rated R: Remixed  (stylized as Rated R /// Remixed) is the second remix album by Barbadian singer Rihanna. It was released on May 8, 2010, in Brazil and Europe and on May 24, 2010, in the United States by Def Jam Recordings. It contains remixes from her fourth studio album, Rated R (2009). The songs were solely remixed by Chew Fu. The majority of the remixes were remastered to incorporate influences from the genre of house music, and incorporate heavy usage of synthesizers as part of their instrumentation.

Rated R: Remixed received a mixed review from Jean Goon for MSN Entertainment. She praised Fu for remixing some of the dark and sombre songs into upbeat dance songs, but criticized the album as it did not provide memorability. The album peaked at number four in Greece and number six on the US Dance/Electronic Albums chart; it peaked at number 33 on the US Top R&B/Hip-Hop Albums chart and number 158 on the US Billboard 200 chart. As of July 2010, Rated R: Remixed has sold 13,000 copies in the US, according to Nielsen SoundScan.

Background and release
Following the release and success of Rated R (2009) and its singles "Russian Roulette", "Hard" and "Rude Boy", it was confirmed on April 14, 2010, by Def Jam Recordings that Rihanna was going to release her second remix album entitled Rated R: Remixed. The singer's first remix album was Good Girl Gone Bad: The Remixes in January 2009. The project was announced as something for fans to bridge the gap while Rihanna was still on the Last Girl on Earth Tour (2010–11) and her fifth studio album, Loud, was not yet released. Rated R: Remixed was exclusively remixed by New York-based electronic record producer, remixer and DJ, Chew Fu. Although the track list on Rated R consists of 13 songs, Rated R: Remixed consists of 10 songs; "Cold Case Love", "The Last Song" and "Te Amo" were not remixed by Fu and were therefore not included. Rated R: Remixed was released on May 8, 2010, in Brazil and various European territories in a digital download format. It was released in the same format on May 24, in the United States.

Composition and reception

Rated R: Remixed includes elements of house music. "Russian Roulette", "Photographs", "Rude Boy" and "Stupid in Love" feature "heavy electro and synth beats". "Wait Your Turn", originally a dubstep and hip hop song, was remastered to a house song. "Stupid in Love", which was originally a pop and R&B power ballad, was also changed to an uptempo house track. Jean Goon for MSN Entertainment gave a mixed review for the album, and awarded it 2.5 stars out of five. Goon was complimentary of how Fu changed some of the more sombre and downtempo songs to incorporate "catchy, upbeat touches." She noted that Goon noted that "Photographs" had undergone a "groovy" transformation, and that the composition complemented Rihanna's vocal performance. With regard to "Stupid in Love", Goon described the remix as "classy enough to be played in a trendy boutique or cafe."

However, Goon was critical of "Russian Roulettes production, writing that Fu appeared to have "got a little carried away" and criticising him for applying electro beats to every song, not all of which may have needed them. The critic noted that "Russian Roulette" was a "mess to listen to." With regard to "Rude Boy", originally an uptempo dance song that incorporates elements of the dancehall, ragamuffin, pop and R&B genres, Goon stated that Fu's production was an attempt to try and "outdo the already upbeat original." Goon concluded although she thought some of the remixes "weren't too bad on the ears," there were not any outstanding or memorable tracks. Furthermore, Goon criticised the remixes for being too heavily distorted with electronic synths which "seemed to compete for our attention rather than complement Rihanna’s vocals."

Commercial performance
In Greece, Rated R: Remixed debuted at number 11 on May 17, 2010. The following week, the album peaked at number four. The album spent a total of two weeks on the album chart. In the United States, the album debuted and peaked at number 158 on the Billboard 200 on June 12, 2010. The album stayed on the chart for one week. Rated R: Remixed debuted and peaked at number six on the US Dance/Electronic Albums on June 12, and stayed on the chart for 11 weeks. It debuted and peaked at number 33 on the US Top R&B/Hip-Hop Albums on June 12, and stayed on the chart for 13 weeks. As of July 2010, Rated R: Remixed has sold 13,000 copies in the US, according to Nielsen SoundScan.

Track listing
Credits adapted from the liner notes of Rated R: Remixed.

Notes
 signifies a vocal producer
 signifies a remixer
 signifies a co-producer
 signifies an additional producer

Personnel
Credits for Rated R: Remixed adapted from Allmusic.

 Mykael Alexander – assistant
 Beardyman – vocals
 Jessie Bonds – guitar
 Jay Brown – A&R
 Bobby Campbell – assistant
 Chase & Status – producer, musician
 Chew Fu – Programming, Remix Producer, Remixing
 James J. Cooper III – celli, soloist
 Cédric Culnaërt – assistant engineer
 Tyler Van Dalen – assistant engineer
 Kevin "KD" Davis – mixing
 Steven Dennis – assistant engineer
 Dylan Dresdow – mixing
 Mikkel S. Eriksen – engineer, vocal producer, musician
 James Fauntleroy II – background vocals
 Glenn Fischbach – celli
 Paul Foley – engineer
 Rick Friedrich – assistant engineer
 Future Cut – keyboards
 Mariel Haenn – stylist
 Alex Haldi – design
 Kevin Hanson – assistant
 Chuck Harmony – producer
 Keith Harris – strings
 Ben Harrison – guitar, additional production
 Karl Heilbron – vocal engineer
 Simon Henwood – art direction, design, photography, stylist
 Tor Erik Hermansen – musician
 Jean-Marie Horvat – mixing
 Ghazi Hourani – mixing assistant
 Jaycen Joshua – mixing
 Mike Johnson – engineer
 JP Robinson – art direction, design, photography
 Brian Kennedy – keyboards, programming, producer
 Padraic Kerin – engineer
 Olga Konopelsky – violin
 Emma Kummrow – violin
 Giancarlo Lino – mixing assistant
 Pater Martinez – assistant
 Luigi Mazzocchi – violin, soloist
 Monte Neuble – keyboards
 Terius Nash – producer
 Luis Navarro – assistant engineer
 Shaffer Smith – producer
 Jared Newcomb – mixing assistant
 Peter Nocella – viola
 Chris "Tek" O'Ryan – engineer
 Anthony Palazzole – mixing assistant
 Paper-Boy – additional production
 Ciarra Pardo – art direction, design
 Charles Parker – violin
 Ross "Dights" Parkin – assistant engineer
 Daniel Parry – assistant
 Kevin Porter – assistant
 Antonio Reid – executive producer
 Antonio Resendiz – assistant
 Makeba Riddick – background vocals, vocal producer
 Rihanna – executive producer, art direction, design
 Montez Roberts – assistant engineer
 Evan Rogers – executive producer
 Sébastien Salis – assistant engineer
 Jason Sherwood – assistant engineer
 Tyran "Ty Ty" Smith – A&R
 Caleb Speir – bass
 Stargate – producer
 Status – producer
 Xavier Stephenson – assistant
 Christopher "Tricky" Stewart – producer
 Tim Stewart – guitar
 Bernt Rune – stray guitar
 Carl Styrken – executive producer
 Rob Swire –  musician
 Igor Szwec – violin
 Sean Tallman – engineer
 Marcos Taylor – engineer
 Gregory Teperman – violin
 Brian "B-Luv" Thomas – engineer
 Pat Thrall – engineer
 Marcos Tovar – engineer
 Neil Tucker – assistant, guitar engineer
 Ellen Von Unwerth – photography
 Alain Whyte – acoustic guitar
 Andrew Wuepper – engineer
 Ys – producer

Charts

Release history

References

Rihanna albums
2010 remix albums
Def Jam Recordings remix albums